The 128th district of the Texas House of Representatives contains parts of Harris County. The current Representative is Briscoe Cain, who was first elected in 2016.

References 

128